Miriam-Stefanie Kastlunger (born 2 March 1994, Innsbruck) is an Austrian luger. She represented Austria at the 2014 Winter Olympics in Sochi in women's and team relay competitions. In the women's singles, she finished 17th. In the team relay, together with Wolfgang Kindl (men's single) and Andreas Linger / Wolfgang Linger (double), she became 7th.

Kastlunger was both women's and team relay champion in luge at the 2012 Winter Youth Olympics which took place in Innsbruck.

References

External links
 

 

1994 births
Living people
Austrian female lugers
Olympic lugers of Austria
Lugers at the 2014 Winter Olympics
Lugers at the 2012 Winter Youth Olympics
Youth Olympic gold medalists for Austria
20th-century Austrian women
21st-century Austrian women